Polyaster is a genus of flowering plants belonging to the family Rutaceae.

Its native range is Northern America.

Species:
 Polyaster boronioides Benth. & Hook.f.

References

Zanthoxyloideae
Zanthoxyloideae genera